Fantaisie militaire (Military fantasy) is the tenth studio album by the French rock musician Alain Bashung, released in January 1998 by Barclay Records.

Production 
For this album, Bashung worked with the English record producer and engineer Ian Caple and with artists such as the Valentins, Rodolphe Burger, Joseph Racaille and Adrian Utley of Portishead. Most of the songs were written by Jean Fauque.

The song "Samuel Hall" is a drum and bass reworking of the folk song "Sam Hall".

Reception

Commercial performance 
The album reached #1 on the French charts. It is one of Bashung's greatest successes, helped by the successful single "La nuit je mens".

Critical reception 

Fantaisie militaire marked a turn in Bashung's career. He was awarded three Victoires de la musique awards in 1999: Male Artist of the Year, Best Album of the Year, and Video of the Year for the single "La nuit je mens". In 2005, the Victoires ranked it the best French album since 1985. The Belgian rock historian Gilles Verlant included the album in his book La discothèque parfaite de l'odyssée du rock, lauding it as a "chef d'œuvre" and the "shining diamond of the winter of 1998". He added that the album showed "Bashung mix the sounds and his inspiration with a perfect mastery of studio incidents" and that "its precision is that of a goldsmith, a jeweler, a maniac watchmaker". In 2010, the French edition of Rolling Stone magazine named Fantaisie militaire the ninth greatest French rock album ever made.

Track listing

Personnel

Musicians 
 Alain Bashung - vocals
 Édith Fambuena - electric guitar, acoustic guitar, bass guitar (8), programming
 Jean-Louis Pierot - synthesizers, Hammond organ, harpsichord, Leslie piano, vibraphone, piano, programming
 Martyn Barker - drums, Turc and African percussion
 Simon Edwards - electric bass guitar, sentir, percussions, harpsichord
 Adrian Utley - electric guitars
 Rodolphe Burger - guitars (8), programming (8)
 Joseph Racaille  string arrangements
 Alhambra - string ensemble 
 Virginie Michaud  musical direction

Production 
 Ian Caple: producer, engineer, programming and mixing
 Jean Lamoot: assistant sound engineer, Pro Tools assistant, preproduction direction, programming, recording
 Anne Lamy: executive production
 Pascale Jaupard: management

Charts

Weekly charts

Year-end charts

Certifications

References 

1998 albums
Barclay (record label) albums
Alain Bashung albums